On the night of September 6, 2018, 26-year-old accountant Botham Jean was murdered when off-duty Dallas Police Department patrol officer Amber Guyger entered Jean's apartment in Dallas, Texas and fatally shot him. Guyger, who said that she had entered Jean's apartment believing it was her own and believed Jean to be a burglar, was initially charged with manslaughter. The absence of a murder charge led to protests and accusations of racial bias, since Jean was a black man and unarmed and was killed in his own home by a white off-duty officer who had apparently disregarded police protocols. On November 30, 2018, Guyger was indicted on a charge of murder. On October 1, 2019, she was found guilty of murder, and was sentenced to ten years' imprisonment the following day. The ruling was upheld on appeal in 2021.

Murder 

Botham Jean and Amber Guyger lived in South Side Flats, a four-story apartment complex located at the corner of South Lamar Street and Powhattan Street—two blocks northwest of the headquarters of Dallas Police Department, for which Guyger worked as a patrol officer—in the Cedars district in South Dallas. The floor plans for each level of the building are mostly identical. Guyger's apartment on the third floor (number 1378), in which she had lived for approximately two months by the time of the murder, was located directly below Jean's apartment on the fourth floor (number 1478).

On September 6, 2018, Guyger left work at 9:33 p.m. at the end of a 13.5-hour shift. She drove to the apartment complex, parking her vehicle in the parking garage of the fourth floor at 9:46 pm. At this time, she was speaking over the phone with her partner, who had telephoned her during her journey home, in a conversation which lasted until 9:55 pm. Still armed with a handgun but no longer wearing a body camera, Guyger walked to Jean's apartment, supposedly believing it was her own and failing to notice any signs that she was on the wrong floor, including a distinctive red doormat outside the apartment. Attempting to unlock the door, she noticed it was ajar. She entered the apartment and found Jean, who was sitting in his living room eating ice cream, unarmed. Guyger fired her handgun twice at Jean, striking him in the chest. She would later testify that she believed him to be an intruder, and that she feared he would kill her. Guyger telephoned 9-1-1 at 9:59 pm. Jean was taken to a nearby hospital, where he died from his wound. The Texas Rangers investigated the shooting, which led to Guyger's arrest three days later.

Guyger was initially charged with manslaughter, but was later charged with murder. The initial charge of manslaughter and the racial aspect of the shooting resulted in protests in the following days.

The Dallas Police Department placed Guyger on paid administrative leave after the shooting. The department fired her on September 24, 2018.

Victim 

Botham Shem Jean, a 26-year-old black man, was a Harding University alumnus and an accountant for PricewaterhouseCoopers (PwC). Jean was born in Saint Lucia.

Following the shooting, an attorney representing Jean's family accused the Dallas Police Department of attempting to smear Jean's reputation by publicizing a police affidavit showing that police seized  of marijuana from Jean's apartment. The lawyers also disputed the account of the incident that Guyger told officials, which was recorded in the arrest warrant affidavit, and asserted that two independent witnesses had come forward to give recollections that conflicted with Guyger's account. An attorney for Jean asserted that witnesses claimed they heard knocking on the door to Jean's apartment and that a witness claimed they heard a woman's voice saying "Let me in, let me in."

Perpetrator 

Amber Renée Guyger (born August 9, 1988) was 30 years old at the time of the shooting.  She had been on the Dallas police force for almost five years.

Trial 
On November 30, 2018, Guyger was indicted on murder charges by a Dallas County grand jury. On September 22, 2019, the day before the trial began, Dallas County District Attorney John Creuzot took part in an interview regarding the trial in spite of a gag order issued by Judge Tammy Kemp in January of that year. After questioning jurors, who reported that they had not seen the interview or other media coverage of the trial, Kemp denied the defense's motion for a mistrial, and sequestered the jury.

Manslaughter charges would have merely required proof of recklessness, while murder charges require proof that the defendant intended to kill. The prosecutors alleged criminal intent for two reasons: firstly, they said her arrival at the wrong apartment (on the wrong floor) was not caused by tiredness, but rather caused by the conversation she had immediately prior with her lover trying to arrange a meeting that night, and secondly that she did not follow standard police protocol of not entering a building with a potential burglar inside and instead calling for backup from the police station, which was only two blocks away.

On October 1, 2019, Guyger was found guilty of murder. The jury deliberated for six hours to reach the verdict of murder. The jurors also considered the lesser charge of manslaughter. She was the first Dallas police officer to be convicted of murder since the 1973 murder of Santos Rodriguez.

On October 2, 2019, Guyger was sentenced to 10 years in prison after the jury deliberated for an hour. During the sentencing hearing, Jean's mother Allison provided emotional testimony and some of Guyger's text messages and social media posts that were "racist and offensive" were shared. Jean's younger brother Brandt forgave and hugged Guyger during her sentencing.  Jean's father Bertrum also stated that he forgave Guyger but had wanted a stiffer sentence. Trial judge Tammy Kemp drew controversy when she embraced Guyger and handed her a Bible, with the Freedom from Religion Foundation criticizing her for alleged proselytizing.

Guyger's legal bills were paid by the Dallas Police Association, a union which serves Dallas police officers.

On October 16, 2019, Guyger's attorneys filed a notice of appeal requesting a new trial. On August 7, 2020, Guyger's attorneys filed an appeal, alleging that insufficient evidence existed to convict her of murder. The appeal sought either an acquittal, or a reduction in charge to criminally negligent homicide with a new hearing for sentencing on the reduced charge. On August 5, 2021, the Fifth Court of Appeals of Texas upheld Guyger's murder conviction, unanimously holding that the jury verdict was reasonable and Guyger's own testimony supported the murder charge. On November 17 of that year, the Fifth Court of Appeals again upheld her murder conviction using similar reasoning, stating that her defense that she had unknowingly entered the wrong apartment did not justify the lesser charge of criminally negligent homicide. Her appeal to the Texas Court of Criminal Appeals, the court of last resort for criminal cases in the state, was denied.

Guyger is currently imprisoned in the Mountain View Correctional Center. She will be eligible for release as early as September 2024, although her full sentence runs until September 2029.

Controversies involving witnesses
On January 31, 2019, ABC News reported that a female witness—identified only as "Bunny"—had taken a video of Guyger's actions immediately after the shooting. The witness claimed to have been harassed and threatened by unidentified Internet trolls after providing the video to the Dallas County District Attorney's Office and later posting it on social media.

Witnesses could not describe the shooter or shooters, only the vehicle they drove. On October 8, Dallas police announced that they had identified three suspects in Brown's killing and had arrested one of them, and that the suspects were engaged in a drug deal with Brown when he was shot. A search of Brown's apartment yielded  of marijuana,  of THC cartridges and $4,000 in cash; however, advocates questioned police claims that the three men had traveled  from Alexandria, Louisiana, to purchase drugs from Brown, and an attorney representing Brown's family called for an independent investigation by another agency. Dallas Assistant Police Chief Avery Brown denied that Joshua Brown's death was related to Guyger's trial. A second suspect was arrested the next day, and on December 8, all three men were indicted on charges of capital murder, although one of them remained at large.

Memorials 

The street passes Jean's former apartment and Dallas police headquarters.

See also 
List of unarmed African Americans killed by law enforcement officers in the United States
List of killings by law enforcement officers in the United States, September 2018
Shooting of Atatiana Jefferson

References 

 

2018 controversies in the United States
2018 crimes in Texas
2018 deaths
2018 murders in the United States
2010s in Dallas
2018 in Texas
Jean, Botham
Dallas Police Department
Murder in Dallas
African Americans shot dead by law enforcement officers in the United States
September 2018 events in the United States
21st-century American trials
Murders by law enforcement officers in the United States